Mark Christopher Lomas (born 14 May 1970) is an English cricketer.  Lomas is a right-handed batsman.  He was born at Blackburn, Lancashire.

Lomas represented the Lancashire Cricket Board in 3 List A matches.  These came against the Netherlands in the 1999 NatWest Trophy, the Yorkshire Cricket Board in the 2001 Cheltenham & Gloucester Trophy and Cheshire in the 1st round of the 2002 Cheltenham & Gloucester Trophy which was held in 2002.  In his total of 3 List A matches, he scored 17 runs at a batting average of 5.66, with a high score of 15.  In the field he took a single catch. He also represented Lancashire CCC 2nd XI in 3 matches.

He represented 4 major league teams in 3 leagues

East Lancashire CC in The Lancashire league scoring 9463 runs in 448 matches and taking 290 catches the 2nd highest ever in the leagues history.
Blackpool and Morecambe CC both in the Northern league scoring 4142 runs in 145 innings 
Blackburn Northern as Professional scoring 1026 runs in the 1999 season

His list of trophies include
Lancashire league winner 1990, runner up 1988,89,96,97 and 98
Woresley cup winner 1987,88 and 98
Interleague cup 2004
Northern league winner 2006
Northern league cup winner 2009

He also played over 100 matches for the Marylebone Cricket Club

He retired in 2017 finishing is career at his boyhood club East Lancashire Cricket Club in the Lancashire League.

References

External links
Mark Lomas at Cricinfo
Mark Lomas at CricketArchive

1970 births
Living people
Cricketers from Blackburn
English cricketers
Lancashire Cricket Board cricketers